The 2012–13 North Carolina Tar Heels men's basketball team represented the University of North Carolina at Chapel Hill in the 2012–13 NCAA Division I men's basketball season. The team's head coach was Roy Williams, who is in his 10th season as UNC's head men's basketball coach. They played their home games at the Dean E. Smith Center and were members of the Atlantic Coast Conference. They finished the season 25–11, 12–6 in ACC play to finish in third place. They advanced to the championship game of the ACC tournament where they lost to Miami (FL). They received an at-large bid to the 2013 NCAA tournament where they defeated Villanova in the second round before, in the third round, having their season ended for the second consecutive year by Kansas.

Pre-season

Departures

Recruits

Coach Williams adjusted his line-up starting with the game against Duke on 13 February 2013. He went with a smaller line-up with four guards and moved P.J. Hairston into the starting five.

Roster

Note that the roster is subject to change.

Schedule and results

|-
!colspan=12 style="background:#56A0D3; color:#FFFFFF;"| Exhibition

|-
!colspan=12 style="background:#56A0D3; color:#FFFFFF;"| Non-conference regular season

|-
!colspan=12 style="background:#56A0D3; color:#FFFFFF;"| ACC Regular Season

|-
!colspan=12 style="background:#56A0D3; color:#FFFFFF;"| 2013 ACC Tournament

|-
!colspan=12 style="background:#56A0D3; color:#FFFFFF;"| 2013 NCAA Tournament

Rankings

Team players drafted into the NBA

References

North Carolina
North Carolina Tar Heels men's basketball seasons
North Carolina
Tar
Tar